Almahdi Rural District may refer to the following places in Iran:
 Almahdi Rural District (Hamadan Province)
 Almahdi Rural District (Naqadeh County), West Azerbaijan province